Oltrona di San Mamette is a comune (municipality) in the Province of Como in the Italian region Lombardy, located about  northwest of Milan and about  southwest of Como. As of 31 December 2004, it had a population of 2,190 and an area of 2.7 km².

The municipality of Oltrona di San Mamette contains the frazioni (subdivisions, mainly villages and hamlets) Cerc and Gerbo.

Oltrona di San Mamette borders the following municipalities: Appiano Gentile, Beregazzo con Figliaro, Lurate Caccivio, Olgiate Comasco.

Demographic evolution

References

Cities and towns in Lombardy